Baba Mohammadi (born February 14, 1991) is an Iranian footballer who plays for Paykan in the Iran's Premier Football League.

Club career
Mohammadi started his career with Paykan at youth level. In the Summer of 2012 he was moved to first team by the coach Abdollah Veisi. He made his debut against Gahar.

Club career statistics

International

U22
He is invited to Iran U-22 by Alireza Mansourian.

References

External links
 Baba Mohammadi at PersianLeague.com

1991 births
Living people
Paykan F.C. players
Giti Pasand players
Iranian footballers
Association football forwards